The 1988–89 Wisconsin Badgers men's basketball team represented the University of Wisconsin as a member of the Big Ten Conference during the 1988–89 NCAA Division I men's basketball season.

Awards and honors
All-American

 Danny Jones - Honorable Mention (AP)

All-Big Ten

 Danny Jones - 2nd team (AP and UPI)
 Trent Jackson - 2nd team (AP), 3rd team (UPI)

Big Ten Player of the Week

 Trent Jackson - Week of February 14

Team awards

 Trent Jackson - MVP
 Willie Simms - Most Improved
 Darin Schubring - Defensive POY

Roster 

 

 

 

 

 

 

 *ineligible first semester due to transfer from Marquette   ^academically ineligible second semester

Schedule and results 

|-
!colspan=8| Regular Season
|-

|-
!colspan=8| National Invitation Tournament

Player statistics

References

Wisconsin Badgers men's basketball seasons
Wisconsin
Wisconsin
Wisconsin Badgers men's basketball
Wisconsin Badgers men's basketball